The 2010 Edition of MTV Africa Music Awards were held on Saturday, December 11, 2010 in Lagos, Nigeria. The show was hosted by American rapper Eve.

Winners & nominees

Best Video
Fally Ipupa - Sexy dance (DRC)
P-Square f/t J. Martins- E No Easy (Nigeria)
The Parlotones - Life Design (South Africa)
Banky W - Strong Ting (Nigeria)

Brand:New
Mo'Cheddah (Nigeria)
Diamond Platnumz (Tanzania)
Muthoni (Kenya)
JoJo (Gabon)

Artist of The Year
2 Face (Nigeria)
P-Square (Nigeria)
Jozi (South Africa)
Fally Ipupa (DRC)

Song Of The Year
Liquideep - Fairytale (South Africa)
D'Banj - Fall In Love (Nigeria)
JR - Show Dem (South Africa)
Banky W - Lagos Party (Nigeria)

Best Anglophone
Daddy Owen feat Dunco and Kera (Kenya)
Sarkodie (Ghana)
Wande Coal (Nigeria)
Big Nuz (South Africa)

Best Francophone
Fally Ipupa (DRC)
Awadi (Senegal)
DJ Arafat (Ivory Coast)
Ba Ponga (Gabon)

Best Lusophone
Cabo Snoop (Angola)
Lizha James (Mozambique)
Paul G (Angola)
Dama Do Bling (Mozambique)

Best Group
P-Square (Nigeria)
Radio & Weasel (Uganda)
Teargas (South Africa)
P-Unit (Kenya)

Best Female
Sasha (Nigeria)
Lizha James (Mozambique)
Nneka (Nigeria)
Barbara Kanam (DRC)

Best Male
2Face (Nigeria)
Fally Ipupa (DRC)
Black Coffee (South Africa)
Wande Coal (Nigeria)

Best International
Eminem (USA)
Rihanna (Barbados)
Drake (Canada)
Rick Ross (USA)

MAMA Legend
Miriam Makeba (South Africa)

MAMA 2010 Performers
Announced to date:
2Face (Nigeria)
Banky W (Nigeria)
Barbara Kanam (DRC)
Big Nuz (South Africa)
Cabo Snoop (Angola)
Daddy Owen (Kenya)
Diamond (Tanzania)
Eve (USA)
Fally Ipupa (DRC)
J. Martins (Nigeria)
Jozi (South Africa)
Liquideep (South Africa)
Lizha James (Mozambique)
Mo Cheddah (Nigeria)
Paul G (Angola)
P-Unit (Kenya)
The Parlotones (South Africa)
Public Enemy (USA)
Radio & Weasel (Uganda)
Rick Ross (USA)
Sarkodie (Ghana)
Sasha (Nigeria)
T-Pain (USA)
Teargas (South Africa)
Wande Coal (Nigeria)

2010 Sponsors
The 2010 MTV Africa Music Awards was sponsored by Airtel in association with MasterCard. The MTV Africa Music Awards with Airtel is also supported by Arik Air and the Lagos State Government.

References

External links 
MTV Africa Music Awards

2010 music awards
MTV Africa Music Awards
2010 in Nigerian music
November 2010 events in Africa
21st century in Lagos